Joshua Robert Tyler Minott (born November 25, 2002) is a Jamaican-American professional basketball player for the Minnesota Timberwolves of the National Basketball Association (NBA). He played college basketball for the Memphis Tigers.

High school career
Minott played basketball for Saint Andrew's School in Boca Raton, Florida. In his junior season, he averaged 17.2 points, 7.4 rebounds and 3.3 assists per game, helping his team win the Class 3A state championship, its first state title. As a senior, Minott averaged 23.1 points and 8.3 rebounds per game, and was named Palm Beach County Class 5A-1A Player of the Year by the Sun-Sentinel. A four-star recruit, he committed to playing college basketball for Memphis over offers from Florida State, Texas, Baylor and Maryland.

College career
On January 23, 2022, Minott recorded a career-high 18 points and nine rebounds in an 83–81 win over Tulsa. As a freshman at Memphis, he averaged 6.6 points and 3.8 rebounds in 14.6 minutes per game. Minott was named to the American Athletic Conference (AAC) All-Freshman Team and was a three-time AAC Freshman of the Week. On March 24, 2022, he declared for the 2022 NBA draft while maintaining his college eligibility. He opted to remain in the draft, forgoing his remaining college eligibility.

Professional career

Minnesota Timberwolves (2022–present) 
In the 2022 NBA draft, Minott was drafted by the Charlotte Hornets with the 45th pick in the draft. He was later traded to the Minnesota Timberwolves, along with a 2023 second-round draft pick via the New York Knicks in exchange for Bryce McGowens, the 40th pick in the draft. Minott joined the Timberwolves' 2022 NBA Summer League roster. In his Summer League debut, Minott scored twenty-two points and had ten rebounds in a 85–78 win over the Denver Nuggets. On July 17, 2022, Minott signed a four-year, $6.8M deal with the Timberwolves.

National team career
Minott was born in Florida but plays for the Jamaican national team. At the 2019 Centrobasket Under-17 Championship in Puerto Rico, he averaged 26 points, nine rebounds and 4.6 steals per game.

Career statistics

College

|-
| style="text-align:left;"| 2021–22
| style="text-align:left;"| Memphis
| 33 || 5 || 14.6 || .522 || .143 || .754 || 3.8 || .9 || .8 || .7 || 6.6

References

External links

Memphis Tigers bio

2002 births
Living people
American men's basketball players
American sportspeople of Jamaican descent
Basketball players from Florida
Charlotte Hornets draft picks
Iowa Wolves players
Jamaican men's basketball players
Memphis Tigers men's basketball players
Minnesota Timberwolves players
Small forwards
Sportspeople from Boca Raton, Florida